Artist Julius Dubose (born December 6, 1995), known professionally as A Boogie wit da Hoodie (or simply A Boogie), is an American rapper, singer, and songwriter. He is signed to Atlantic Records, as well as his own label imprint, Highbridge the Label. His stage name is derived from the character "Ace Boogie" from the 2002 film Paid in Full, and because he was wearing hoodies all the time, friends gave him the nickname "A Boogie wit da Hoodie".

His highest charting singles are "Numbers" (which debuted at number 23 on the Billboard Hot 100), "Look Back at It" (number 27), and "Drowning" (number 38). His debut studio album, The Bigger Artist (2017), debuted at number four on the Billboard 200 chart. He released his second studio album, Hoodie SZN (2018), which became his first number one album on the Billboard 200. His third studio album, Artist 2.0 (2020), debuted at number two on the Billboard 200. He released his fourth studio album,  Me vs. Myself on December 9, 2022.

Early life and education
Artist Julius Dubose was born on December 6, 1995, in the Highbridge neighborhood of the Bronx in New York City. Dubose was raised in Highbridge and began rapping at age twelve after listening to Kanye West and 50 Cent. He attended Dewitt Clinton High School, where he expanded upon rapping during his freshman year, engaging in cyphers at lunchtime by performing rhymes he had already written and stored in a large notebook he carried with him. Remarking on his time in high school to XXL, he said "I was regular, everybody really noticed me. I was the one in the back of the classroom, quiet."

Growing up, Dubose frequently got into legal trouble, mainly for selling cannabis and narcotics. After finding out what he was doing, Dubose's parents sent him to Florida as punishment. He attended Fort Pierce Central in Fort Pierce, Florida.In Florida, Dubose was kept under house arrest. During this confinement, he began to work on his artistry, starting off by tweaking his self-composed rhymes and gradually leading one thing to another. He even built an amateur studio inside the apartment that he lived in. Following his high school graduation, Dubose continued to focus on his music while working jobs in different, sectors including construction and pizza delivery.

Career

2015–2016: Career beginnings

Dubose's official discography began with the single "Temporary", which he released on SoundCloud. He was just nineteen at the time of its release. The song lacked good rhythm and flow, which is usually required for a good hip-hop number. Myster Whyte, who he met in Florida and produced the song, showed A Boogie the inside of his first professional studio. He asked A Boogie to work with a trainer until he got his techniques right. Dubose's said, "I used to record songs like, play the beat from one phone and have another phone recording me and just rap. Moving from that to a studio was like, 'Damn, I never knew I could sound like this'. It was just magic". The training sessions with Myster helped progress his sound.

In 2015, Dubose moved back to New York in an attempt to start making hip hop his full-time career. He, Don Q, Quincy "QP" Acheampong, and Bubba then created Highbridge the Label and set up a home studio. A Boogie released his first full-length project, a mixtape titled Artist, in February 2016, which launched his career and was on Forbes list of up-and-coming rappers. The mixtape was recorded during a time where Dubose was dealing with a difficult break-up which helped influence the mixtape and Dubose's future sound all together.

Dubose then released a collaborative project, alongside fellow Highbridge-based rapper Don Q, titled Highbridge the Label: The Takeover Vol.1, on May 18, 2016. Dubose went on to have three opening dates on Drake and Future's Summer Sixteen Tour. Dubose was also co-signed by Drake. In July 2016, A Boogie signed a deal with Atlantic Records. In September 2016, he was featured on the BET Hip Hop Awards cypher alongside Don Q, Russ, Kent Jones and Nick Grant. Later in October 2016, A Boogie released his first extended play (EP), titled TBA, in acronym for "The Bigger Artist". The EP peaked at number 63 on the US Billboard 200 chart and appeared on Rolling Stone magazine's 40 Best Rap Albums of 2016 list.

2017–2018: The Bigger Artist and Hoodie SZN
On June 13, 2017, Dubose was named as one of the ten of XXLs "2017 Freshman Class". On September 29, 2017, he released his debut studio album, The Bigger Artist, featuring guest appearances from Chris Brown, Trey Songz, Kodak Black, 21 Savage, PnB Rock and YoungBoy Never Broke Again. The album's lead single, "Drowning" featuring Kodak Black, peaked at number 38 on the US Billboard Hot 100 and became one of his highest charting singles in the country so far.

Dubose was featured on fellow New York rapper 6ix9ine's single, "Keke" on January 14, 2018. The song peaked at number 43 on the Billboard Hot 100. Dubose also appeared on the song "Waka" on 6ix9ine's album Dummy Boy, released in November 2018.

Dubose's second album Hoodie SZN was released on December 21, 2018, with contributions from 6ix9ine, Juice Wrld, Offset and more. It debuted at number 2 on the Billboard 200, selling 90,000 copies in its first week. It reached number one on January 14, 2019. It became one of the most played albums of 2019 and placed number 10 on the Billboard 200 Year-End chart. It also appeared on Billboards Decade-End chart at number 69.

2019–2020: Artist 2.0 
Dubose featured on over 20 songs in 2019, alongside artists such as Ed Sheeran, Rick Ross, Khalid, Ally Brooke, Liam Payne, Lil Durk and Summer Walker. He also toured and performed at concerts throughout 2019 in the US and UK.

On September 13, 2019, Dubose released the first single from his album Artist 2.0 — "Mood Swings", which debuted at 76 on the Billboard Hot 100. On November 15, 2019, Dubose released the second single from Artist 2.0 — "Reply", which features rapper Lil Uzi Vert. It debuted at number 49 on the Billboard Hot 100. (Uzi is also featured on the track "Luv is Art" from the album.) On January 31, 2020, Dubose released the third single from Artist 2.0 called "King of My City". It debuted and peaked at 69 on the Billboard Hot 100.

Artist 2.0 was officially released on February 14, 2020, Valentine's Day. It was his third studio album. Dubose chose to release Artist 2.0 on Valentine's Day due to the first Artist album being released on Valentine's Day in 2016, and also due to the fact it was his daughter's third birthday. 

The album debuted at number two on the Billboard 200 chart, earning 111,000 album-equivalent units (including 3,000 copies in pure album sales) in its first week. Artist 2.0 features contributions by Roddy Ricch, Gunna, DaBaby, Khalid, Summer Walker, Lil Uzi Vert, and more.

Dubose was due to perform at Wireless 2020, alongside other rappers such as AJ Tracey and A$AP Rocky, but the event was cancelled due to the COVID-19 pandemic.

On June 16, 2020, Dubose released "Bleed", the lead single of the deluxe version of Artist 2.0, which was released on June 19, 2020. It peaked at number 57 on the Billboard Hot 100.

2021–present: Hiatus and Me vs. Myself
After dropping the deluxe edition of Artist 2.0, Dubose did not drop any singles for around a year, taking a hiatus. During this period, however, he was featured on songs with artists such as Pop Smoke, Jess Glynne, Nas, Capo Plaza, DJ Khaled, and more.

On May 14, 2021, Dubose returned alongside American rapper Rowdy Rebel and released their song "9 Bridge". 

On May 21, 2021, Dubose released a single featuring Lil Durk, titled "24 Hours". It debuted at number 92 on the Billboard Hot 100.

In July 2021, while Dubose was working on his fourth studio album, around 20 songs for the album were leaked, which delayed the album until late 2022. Dubose stated, "The more songs get leaked, the longer I take to drop, I'm not putting leaked songs on my album and I work hard AF to write all these songs myself! So if you out here leaking sh*t stop eatin up and let me cook".

On December 7, 2021, a day after his 26th birthday, Dubose announced the upcoming release of a new EP as a prequel to his fourth studio album, at that point titled A Boogie vs. Artist,. The EP was titled B4 A Boogie vs. Artist (or simply B4 AVA) and was scheduled for a December 10, 2021, release date. The announcement was accompanied by a snippet of the song "Be Free". The track list of the EP was revealed three days later. "24 Hours," his earlier collaboration with Lil Durk, was included on the EP. One of the songs on the EP, "Man in the Mirror," was released as a single on February 11, 2022. It peaked at 82 on the Billboard Hot 100.

In 2022, Dubose was cast to voice Francis "KG" Leibowitz-Jenkins in the rebooted Disney+ animated series, The Proud Family: Louder and Prouder.

On February 11, 2022, and March 4, 2022, Dubose returned with warmup singles before the release of A Boogie vs. Artist — now called Me vs. Myself.The singles were titled  "Non Judgemental" and "Hit Different", featuring New York drill rapper B-Lovee.

Dubose dropped a single on April 1, 2022 called "Playa", featuring American singer H.E.R., and with Dubose's girlfriend Ella Rodriguez.

On September 5, 2022, Dubose finally announced the date for his fourth studio album, Me vs. Myself, set for release on November 4, 2022.

One single from the album dropped on October 7, 2022, called "B.R.O (Better Ride Out)", featuring American rapper Roddy Ricch. Just two weeks later, on October 21, 2022, Dubose released "Take Shots" featuring Canadian rapper Tory Lanez. On October 27, he revealed the album's tracklist, which listed the song titles and blurred out the names of the featured artists for their unreleased songs with him, along with listing which side each song is on: "Artist" or "A Boogie".

Following the pushing back of Drake and 21 Savage's collaborative album, Her Loss, from October 28, 2022 to November 4, 2022,  Dubose announced that he was delaying his own album so as to not share a release date with the duo — Me vs. Myself was pushed back until December 9, 2022.

The album's final single, "Ballin", was exclusively released on NBA 2K23 on November 1, 2022; it was later added to all digital platforms on November 4, 2022.

Me vs. Myself was released on December 9, 2022.

Personal life

Legal issues
In 2017, Lil B accused Dubose and PnB Rock of jumping him at the California Rolling Loud festival. Many members of the hip hop community, such as Big Sean and SpaceGhostPurrp, criticized Dubose for his role in the incident. However all things were settled and Lil B and Dubose squashed their beef two days later, through a meeting initiated by Kilo Kurt of Thizz Entertainment.

In January 2021, Dubose was sued by a Bergen County, New Jersey, couple, who claimed that he clogged the toilets and caused $260,000 in damages in their mansion, which they had leased to him in 2017 and 2018.

Dubose was arrested a day after celebrating his 25th birthday in December 2020. A representative for the Bergen County Prosecutor's Office confirmed that A Boogie was arrested on December 7, 2020, on charges of unlawful possession of a handgun (2nd-degree felony) and possession of marijuana. Dubose was taken into custody following an investigation conducted by detectives from the Bergen County Prosecutor's Office (BCPO), who obtained a warrant to search A Boogie's Demarest, New Jersey, home. BCPO detectives were accompanied by detectives from the New York City Police Department and officers from the Demarest Police Department. While doing a search of Dubose's home, law enforcement seized four guns: "a Ruger .380 handgun, a Glock .40 caliber handgun, an H&K 9mm handgun and a Smith & Wesson 9mm handgun." They also discovered "hollow point bullets, various high capacity magazines" as well as "marijuana, hashish oil edibles and drug paraphernalia commonly associated with the distribution of controlled dangerous substances." Dubose's security guard, 33-year-old Quashaun Hagler, was also arrested. Hagler, who is a Georgia resident, appears to have been at A Boogie's home at the time of the search and arrest. Hagler was charged with three counts of unlawful possession of a handgun (a 2nd-degree felony) and one count of possession of a large capacity magazine (a 4th-degree felony).

Dubose was arrested at London's Wireless Festival in September 2021 by the Metropolitan Police, by request of the Greater Manchester Police. He was shortly released with the charges not made public.

Relationships

Dubose has two children with girlfriend and social media influencer Ella Bands. Their daughter Melody Valentine Dubose was born on Valentine's Day, February 14, 2017, and their son Artist Dubose, Jr. was born on June 27, 2020.

Highbridge the Label

Highbridge the Label is an American record label founded by A Boogie wit da Hoodie, Don Q, Quincy "QP" Acheampong and Sambou "Bubba" Camara in 2016. Highbridge the Label partnered with Atlantic Records to sign a deal to have full control of the artists. In 2021 Highbridge the Label also partnered with EMPIRE to sign Don Q & Lil Rekk. In 2022, a subsidiary label of Highbridge the Label was created called H.E.A.V.Y. Current members of the label include Bouba Savage & Wowdy HBTL.

Roster

Discography

Studio albums
 The Bigger Artist (2017)
 Hoodie SZN (2018)
 Artist 2.0 (2020)
 Me vs. Myself (2022)

Filmography

Film

Television

Awards and nominations

BET Awards

|-
| 2018
| A Boogie wit da Hoodie
| Best New Artist
| 
|-

ASCAP

|-
| rowspan="2"|2020
| rowspan="2"|"Look Back at It"
| Nominated for Rhythm & Soul Music
| 
|-
| Nominated for Pop Music
| 
|-

See also
 List of highest-certified music artists in the United States

References

External links

 
 
 
 

1995 births
Living people
21st-century American rappers
21st-century African-American male singers
African-American male rappers
African-American male singer-songwriters
American contemporary R&B singers
American hip hop singers
Atlantic Records artists
Rappers from the Bronx
Singer-songwriters from New York (state)
Trap musicians